United Nations Security Council resolution 1162, adopted unanimously on 17 April 1998, after recalling resolutions 1132 (1997) and 1156 (1998) on the situation in Sierra Leone, the Council authorised the deployment of 10 United Nations military liaison and security advisory personnel to ascertain the situation in the country.

The Security Council welcomed the efforts of the President of Sierra Leone Ahmad Tejan Kabbah to restore peace, stability and governance. Observers from the Economic Community of West African States (ECOWAS) and United Nations had played an important role. The resolution authorised the deployment of up to 10 liaison and security advisory personnel for up to 90 days under the authority of the Secretary-General's Special Envoy to report on the military situation, to assist the Economic Community of West African States Monitoring Group (ECOMOG) and the design of a disarmament plan. There would soon be a decision on the deployment of United Nations troops, including human rights observers, after the office of the Special Envoy was strengthened in the capital Freetown.

Finally, Member States were urged to provide humanitarian assistance to Sierra Leone following an appeal, participate in the reconstruction of the country and to contribute to a trust fund created to support peacekeeping operations in Sierra Leone.

See also
 History of Sierra Leone
 List of United Nations Security Council Resolutions 1101 to 1200 (1997–1998)
 Sierra Leone Civil War

References

External links
 
Text of the Resolution at undocs.org

 1162
1998 in Sierra Leone
Sierra Leone Civil War
 1162
April 1998 events